KPIN (101.1 FM) is a radio station broadcasting a country music format. Licensed to Pinedale, Wyoming, United States, the station serves the Pinedale area.   the station is owned by Robert R. Rule.

Signal
KPIN's signal covers almost all of Sublette County, and parts of northern Sweetwater County. Since Pinedale is located at the base of the southern flank of the Wind River Range, and due to the line-of-sight propagation of FM, the signal begins to get choppy to the north, the farther one travels into the mountain range. Those skiing at nearby White Pine Ski Resort, about seven miles north of Pinedale, will notice the signal fading as they travel closer to the ski resort.

The transmitter is located on a small hill directly southwest of town, along with several FM translator stations and the tower for KUWX 90.9 FM.

References

External links

Radio stations established in 1996
PIN
Country radio stations in the United States